A number of steamships were named Washingtonian, including:

, in service 1914–15
, in service 1919–42

Ship names